TSV Schilksee is a German association football club from the Schilksee suburb of Kiel, Schleswig-Holstein. The club's greatest success has been promotion to the tier four Regionalliga Nord in 2014, following a league championship in the Schleswig-Holstein-Liga.

The club also offers other sports like European handball, swimming and table tennis.

History
Formed in 1947 TSV Schilksee played the majority of its history as a local amateur side. It dropped as far as the tier eight Kreisklasse A Kiel in the mid-2000s before rising through the league system again from 2009 onwards. The club won three promotions in four seasons, climbing from the Kreisklasse A via the Kreisliga and Verbandsliga to the tier five Schleswig-Holstein-Liga in 2013. The club finished eleventh in the league in its first season there before winning the league in 2014–15. The latter allowed the club to take part in the promotion round to the Regionalliga Nord, where it overcame Bremer SV and VfV 06 Hildesheim to win promotion. After just a season in the Regionalliga the club was relegated back to the Schleswig-Holstein-Liga in 2016, which was renamed Oberliga Schleswig-Holstein by the next season. 
Financial hardships and a loss of ability to be competitive led TSV to withdraw from league football in 2019 after an automatic relegation from the Oberliga for withdrawing from the league and missing three match days. TSV's results were expunged from the league table.

The club's now defunct women's team twice took part in the DFB-Pokal, in 2002–03 and 2003–04, reaching the second round once.

Honours
The club's honours:
Schleswig-Holstein-Liga: 2015
 Verbandsliga Schleswig-Holstein-Nord-Ost: 2013; runners-up 2012

Recent seasons
The recent season-by-season performance of the club:

 With the introduction of the Regionalligas in 1994 and the 3. Liga in 2008 as the new third tier, below the 2. Bundesliga, all leagues below dropped one tier. The Schleswig-Holstein-Liga was renamed Oberliga Schleswig-Holstein in 2017.

References

External links
 
Official site of the football department 
TSV Schilksee at worldfootball.net

Football clubs in Germany
Football clubs in Schleswig-Holstein
Association football clubs established in 1947
1947 establishments in Germany
Sport in Kiel